</noinclude>

Raúl Ruiz Matarín (born 25 March 1990) is a Spanish footballer who plays for Hércules CF as a right winger.

Club career
Ruiz was born in Alicante, Valencian Community. After reaching the club's youth system at the age of 10 he was promoted to hometown Hércules CF's first team for the 2008–09 season, appearing sparingly – but scoring once – as they fell short of a La Liga promotion.

Ruiz signed with Real Madrid in summer 2009, being immediately relocated to its reserve side. On 1 February 2011, he was loaned out to Swedish club Halmstads BK along with Castilla teammates Javi Hernández and José Zamora.

In late January 2012, Ruiz terminated his contract with Real Madrid and signed until June 2013 with Albacete Balompié in the third division. After a loan stint at UD San Sebastián de los Reyes of the same level, he featured more regularly during the 2013–14 campaign, which ended in promotion.

On 1 August 2014, Ruiz joined CD Guijuelo also in the third tier.

International career
In November 2008, Ruiz was summoned by the Spain under-21 team, appearing in a friendly with Portugal in Cartaxo. He came on as a substitute for Dani Parejo in the 80th minute of a 4–1 loss.

On 10 February 2009, also from the bench and in a friendly (he took the place of Fran Mérida at half-time), Ruiz scored the third and final goal for the under-19s in a 3–0 win over England, in Bournemouth.

Career statistics

Club

References

External links

1990 births
Living people
Spanish footballers
Footballers from Alicante
Association football wingers
Segunda División players
Segunda División B players
Segunda Federación players
Hércules CF B players
Hércules CF players
Real Madrid Castilla footballers
Albacete Balompié players
UD San Sebastián de los Reyes players
CD Guijuelo footballers
Allsvenskan players
Halmstads BK players
Cypriot First Division players
AEK Larnaca FC players
Spain youth international footballers
Spain under-21 international footballers
Spanish expatriate footballers
Expatriate footballers in Sweden
Expatriate footballers in Cyprus
Spanish expatriate sportspeople in Sweden
Spanish expatriate sportspeople in Cyprus